is a Japanese former professional footballer who played as a defender and midfielder.

Club career
Suzuki was born in Chiba on February 14, 1984. After graduating from high school, he joined FC Tokyo in 2002. He debuted in 2003. He played many matches as left side midfielder. In 2008, he moved to Vissel Kobe. However his opportunity to play decreased in 2009 and he moved to Ligue 2 club Angers in June 2009. In July 2010, he returned to Japan and signed with Omiya Ardija. He played as regular player as left side back in 2010 season. However he could hardly play in the match behind Kim Young-gwon and Takumi Shimohira from 2011. He moved to Vegalta Sendai in 2014. However he could not play in many matches. He moved to Philippines club Global. He retired end of 2015 season.

International career
In November 2003, Suzuki was selected Japan U-20 national team for 2003 World Youth Championship. At this tournament, he played 4 matches as left side midfielder.

Career statistics

Club

1 Includes Emperor's Cup, Coupe de France and the PFF National Men's Club Championship.
2 Includes League Cup, Coupe de la Ligue and the United Football League Cup.
3 Includes ACL.

International

References

External links

1984 births
Living people
Association football people from Chiba Prefecture
Association football defenders
Japanese footballers
Japan youth international footballers
J1 League players
Ligue 2 players
FC Tokyo players
Vissel Kobe players
Angers SCO players
Omiya Ardija players
Vegalta Sendai players
Global Makati F.C. players
Japanese expatriate footballers
Expatriate footballers in France
Japanese expatriate sportspeople in France
Expatriate footballers in the Philippines
Japanese expatriate sportspeople in the Philippines